Jamal Sellami (born 6 October 1970) is a Moroccan professional football manager and former player who played as a midfielder. He is the coach of the Moroccan club FUS Rabat.

He played for several clubs, including Olympique Casablanca, Raja Casablanca, Maghreb Fez and Beşiktaş J.K. in Turkey.

He played for the Morocco national football team and was a participant at the 1998 FIFA World Cup.

On 2 April 2016, he became manager of Morocco Olympic.

Career statistics

International goals

References

External links

1970 births
Living people
Moroccan footballers
Moroccan expatriate footballers
Morocco international footballers
Footballers from Casablanca
1998 FIFA World Cup players
Beşiktaş J.K. footballers
Raja CA players
2000 African Cup of Nations players
Süper Lig players
Expatriate footballers in Turkey
Moroccan expatriate sportspeople in Turkey
Moroccan football managers
Association football defenders
Raja CA managers
Botola managers